The 2022 West Coast Conference women's basketball tournament was held between March 3 and 8 at Orleans Arena in Las Vegas. Gonzaga won the tournament and with it the conference's automatic bid to the NCAA women's basketball tournament.

Seeds
All conference members qualified for the tournament. Teams were seeded based on the Ken Pomeroy Adjusted Conference Winning Percentage.

* Overall record at end of regular season.

Venue 
For the fourteenth consecutive year, the 2022 WCC Tournament was held in the Orleans Arena. When Orleans Arena is set up for basketball games, the seating capacity is 7,471. The Orleans Arena is located at the 1,886-room Orleans Hotel and Casino, about 1 mile west of the Las Vegas Strip. The tickets for the WCC Tournament typically sell out quickly.

Schedule

Bracket
All games except the championship aired on BYUtv and were simulcast on WCC Network and multiple RSN's: NBC Sports Bay Area, Bally Sports West or Los Angeles, Bally Sports San Diego, and Root Sports. Additional RSN's across the country also aired select games. The championship aired on ESPNU.

* denotes overtime game

See also

 2021–22 NCAA Division I women's basketball season
 West Coast Conference men's basketball tournament
 2022 West Coast Conference men's basketball tournament
 West Coast Conference women's basketball tournament

References

External links

Tournament
West Coast Conference women's basketball tournament
2022 in sports in Nevada
Basketball competitions in the Las Vegas Valley
College basketball tournaments in Nevada
Women's sports in Nevada
College sports tournaments in Nevada